"On The Warpath" is a popular instrumental tune composed by Raymond A. Browne in 1904. "On The Warpath" was the first American popular music to incorporate a repeating tom-tom effect in the score.

References

Bibliography
Browne, Raymond A. "On The Warpath" (Sheet music). New York: F.B. Haviland (1904).
 Pisani, Michael. Imagining Native America in Music. New Haven, CT: Yale University Press (2006).

1904 songs
Songs about Native Americans
Songs by war